Ischnomyia spinosa is a species of fly in the family Anthomyzidae.

References

Anthomyzidae
Articles created by Qbugbot
Insects described in 1911